Anting is a town in Jiading District, Shanghai, bordering Kunshan, Jiangsu to the west.

Overview
Anting is one of the centres of the Chinese automotive industry; it is home to Shanghai Automotive Industry Corporation and includes the German/Chinese joint venture: Shanghai Volkswagen Automotive. This enterprise has the largest market share of passenger cars in China.

The Shanghai International Circuit, China's first Formula One race track, is located near the town, a 15-minute drive away. The Shanghai Auto Museum is also located here, on Boyuan Road.

Subdivisions
, Anting is divided into 20 residential communities and 43 villages, among the most well-known of which is Tamiao, which is nicknamed the "Auto City". In the southern part of town, an extension of "Anting Auto City" called "Anting New Town" is being built in the fashion of "Anting German Town".

German Town

The first phase of Anting New Town construction will be completed in June 2007, with the second phase slated to begin before the end of 2007, the latter spanning three years. Upon completion the hope is that the resulting town will be a modern community, with a noticeably German urban aesthetic, with a capacity of over 50,000 residents. However, amid tentative financial troubles and poor sales of housing and retail, the phase 2 of Anting New Town may be delayed.

German Town is modelled on a modern German-style town with colourful Bauhaus-type buildings. The district was designed by Frankfurt-based architecture firm Albert Speer & Partner. Speer is the son of the eponymous architect who was Hitler’s chief architect during World War II.

Transportation
Anting is served by Line 11 of the Shanghai Metro, connected to the Lifehub shopping center Anting Station. Anting North Railway Station is on the Shanghai–Nanjing Intercity Railway.

Accommodation
The first 5* International hotel, Crowne Plaza Shanghai Anting Golf, opened its doors in Anting, Jiading District on 4 September 2012. It is located at 6555 Boyuan Road.

Entertainment
Lifehub@Anting, an entertainment complex located just beside the Metro Line 11, provides numerous Clothing outlets, local and international restaurants and coffee shops, a supermarket, film theatre, etc.

References

Towns in Shanghai